Peerwana is a village in Faisalabad District near Chak Jhumra, Punjab, Pakistan. It is in Chak Jhumra Town's Union Council#2. It is situated on the Faisalabad to Pindi Bhattian Motorway M3 near Sahianwala Interchange. It is one of the newly built motorways of Pakistan which connects Islamabad and Lahore to Faisalabad. Many people nearby villages have used it as a starting point for Lahore, Islamabad, Peshawar and Multan. It is 140 kilometers away from Lahore and 30 kilometers away from Faisalabad. It was named after Peer Sahab, a prominent saint.

References

Villages in Faisalabad District